WBVN (104.5 FM) is a radio station broadcasting a format consisting primarily of Christian contemporary music along with a few Christian talk and teaching programs. Licensed to Carrier Mills, Illinois, United States, the station serves the Marion-Carbondale (IL) area.  The station is currently owned by Kenneth W. and Jane A. Anderson.

References

External links
 
 

Contemporary Christian radio stations in the United States
BVN